is a former Japanese football player. He played for Japan national team.

Club career
Isogai was born in Uki on April 19, 1969. After graduating from Tokai University, he joined Gamba Osaka in 1992. He played as regular player from first season. He moved to Urawa Reds in 1997. He retired in July 1998.

National team career
In January 1995, Isogai was selected by the Japan national team for the 1995 King Fahd Cup. At this competition, on January 6, he debuted against Nigeria. On January 8, he also played against Argentina. He played two games for Japan in 1995.

Club statistics

National team statistics

References

External links

Japan National Football Team Database

1969 births
Living people
Tokai University alumni
People from Uki, Kumamoto
Association football people from Kumamoto Prefecture
Japanese footballers
Japan international footballers
J1 League players
Gamba Osaka players
Urawa Red Diamonds players
1995 King Fahd Cup players
Association football midfielders